Marvin A. Chirelstein (October 8, 1928 - February 16, 2015) was a Professor Emeritus of Law at Columbia Law School, where he taught for nearly 30 years. He taught a contracts course to first year law students as well as tax and corporate finance courses. Prior to teaching at Columbia, Professor Chirelstein taught for over 15 years at Yale Law School. He authored several course books on law.

Biography
Chirelstein received his B.A. from the University of California, Berkeley in 1950.  Chirelstein received his J.D. from the University of Chicago Law School in 1953, where he was also editor of the University of Chicago Law Review.  After practicing in Washington, D.C. and New York City, he joined the Yale Law School faculty in 1965 and remained at Yale as the William Nelson Cromwell Professor of Law until 1981. Chirelstein was visiting professor at Harvard Law School from 1976 to 1977, and at Columbia Law School from 1981 to 1982. He left for private practice in 1982, but returned to join the Columbia faculty in 1984.

Publications

Books
Federal Income Taxation: A Law Student's Guide to the Leading Cases and Concepts (Foundation Press, 3d ed. 1982)
Cases and Materials on Corporate Finance

Journal articles

References 

2015 deaths
University of California, Berkeley alumni
University of Chicago Law School alumni
American legal scholars
Scholars of tax law
Yale Law School faculty
Columbia Law School faculty
1928 births